A CondoSat is a satellite that supports separate operator payloads on the same spacecraft bus. The name derives from real estate condominiums.

References

Satellites by type
Communications satellites
Satellites
Space industry
Outer space